Sydney Barros (born February 21, 2005) is an American artistic gymnast currently representing Puerto Rico in international competitions.  While representing the United States she was a member of the team that won bronze at the inaugural Junior World Championships.

Early life 
Barros was born to Bifredo and Carine Barros in 2005 in Atlanta, Georgia.  She has four siblings.

Gymnastics career

HOPEs

2016 
In 2016 Baros was part of the HOPEs program.  She competed at the 2016 HOPES Championships where she placed second in the all-around behind Konnor McClain.  She posted the third highest scores on both vault and floor exercise.

Junior

2017 
In 2017 Barros qualified for junior elite status at the KPAC National Qualifier.  In late July she competed at the 2017 U.S. Classic where she placed 18th in the all-around.  She qualified to compete at the 2017 National Championships where she placed 23rd in the all-around.

2018 
In 2018 Barros competed at a verification camp where she placed fourth amongst the juniors behind Sunisa Lee, Kayla DiCello, and Jordan Bowers.  Due to her performance she was named to the team to compete at the Junior Pan American Championships; as a result she was also added to the junior national team.  Later that month Barros traveled to Italy to compete at the 2018 City of Jesolo Trophy alongside her club teammates Ragan Smith and Emma Malabuyo.  While there Barros only competed on floor exercise and vault as her injured her ankle on the latter and withdrew from the remainder of the competition.  Due to the injury she also withdrew from the Pan American Championships.

Barros returned to competition to compete at the 2018 U.S. Classic; however she only competed on uneven bars and balance beam, finishing 13th and 31st respectively.  She competed the all-around at the 2018 National Championships where after day 1 she was ranked 17th.  She withdrew from the second day of competition.

2019 
Barros competed at the Parkettes National Qualifier where she finished second behind éMjae Frazier and re-qualified as a junior elite.  In June Barros competed at the Junior World Championships Trials where she placed third in the all-around and was named to the team to compete at the inaugural Junior World Championships alongside Skye Blakely and Kayla DiCello.

At the Junior World Championships Barros helped the team win bronze behind Russia and China and finished fifth in the all-around.  She qualified to the vault event final in first place. During event finals Barros placed fifth on vault.

In July Barros competed at the U.S. Classic where she won silver in the all-around behind Konnor McClain.  Additionally she won bronze on vault (behind McClain and Blakely) and balance beam (behind McClain and Ciena Alipio), silver on floor exercise behind Blakely, and placed sixth on uneven bars.

In August Barros competed at the U.S. National Championships.  After the first day of competition she recorded a score of 55.250 and was in fourth place.  During the second day of competition scored a 54.550, giving her a total combined score of 109.850 which was a fifth-place finish.  Barros won bronze on uneven bars behind Olivia Greaves and McClain and tied with DiCello and won silver on floor exercise behind DiCello.  As a result, she was named to the junior national team.

Senior

2021 
Barros turned senior in 2021.  She competed at the Winter Cup, U.S. Classic, and the U.S. National Championships.

2022 
Barros finished ninth at the 2022 Winter Cup.  In November Barros officially signed her National Letter of Intent with the UCLA Bruins.  Later that month the International Gymnastics Federation approved her nationality switch allowing Barros to start representing Puerto Rico in international competitions.

Competitive history

References

External links
 
 

2005 births
Living people
American female artistic gymnasts
Medalists at the Junior World Artistic Gymnastics Championships
Gymnasts from Texas
U.S. women's national team gymnasts
People from Lewisville, Texas
Sportspeople from Atlanta
21st-century American women